Kendjiro Matsuda (23 June 1935 – 25 April 2004) was a Japanese sailor. He competed in the Flying Dutchman event at the 1964 Summer Olympics.

References

External links
 

1935 births
2004 deaths
Japanese male sailors (sport)
Olympic sailors of Japan
Sailors at the 1964 Summer Olympics – Flying Dutchman
Place of birth missing